was a fishing video game based on the Antarctic Adventure series.  It was developed by Konami and released on May 7, 2003 exclusively in Japan for  mobile phones. In mid-2004, the game was reissued and hosted by Konami for download for the then internet-based online platform  with the title . The game is no longer available for download, as the service was shut down years later to make way for the new (international) My KONAMI service.

References

See also 
 Tsurikko Penta
 Antarctic Adventure

Mobile games
2003 video games
Konami games
Fishing video games
Japan-exclusive video games
Video games developed in Japan